The Amblyseiinae are a subfamily of mites in the Phytoseiidae family.

Genera
These genera are part of this subfamily:

 Amblyseiella Muma, 1955
 Amblyseiulella Muma, 1961
 Amblyseius Berlese, 1914
 Archeosetus Chant & McMurtry, 2002
 Asperoseius Chant, 1957
 Chelaseius Muma & Denmark, 1968
 Chileseius Gonzalez & Schuster, 1962
 Eharius Tuttle & Muma, 1973
 Euseius De Leon, 1967
 Evansoseius Sheals, 1962
 Fundiseius Muma & Denmark, in Muma 1970
 Honduriella Denmark & Evans, 1999
 Indoseiulus Ehara, 1982
 Iphiseiodes De Leon, 1966
 Iphiseius Berlese, 1921
 Kampimodromus Nesbitt, 1951
 Kampimoseiulella Chant & McMurtry, 2003
 Knopkirie Beard, 2001
 Macmurtryseius Kolodochka & Denmark, 1995
 Macroseius Chant, Denmark & Baker, 1959
 Neoparaphytoseius Chant & McMurtry, 2003
 Neoseiulus Hughes, 1948
 Noeledius Muma & Denmark, 1968
 Okiseius Ehara, 1967
 Olpiseius Beard, 2001
 Paraamblyseiulella Chant & McMurtry, 2003
 Paraamblyseius Muma, 1962
 Paragigagnathus Amitai & Grinberg, 1971
 Parakampimodromus Chant & McMurtry, 2003
 Pholaseius Beard, 2001
 Phyllodromus De Leon, 1959
 Phytoscutus Muma, 1961
 Phytoseiulus Evans, 1952
 Proprioseiopsis Muma, 1961
 Proprioseiulus Muma, 1968
 Proprioseius Chant, 1957
 Quadromalus Moraes, Denmark & Guerrero, 1982
 Ricoseius De Leon, 1965
 Swirskiseius Denmark & Evans, in Denmark, Evans, Aguilar, Vargas & Ochoa 1999
 Typhlodromips De Leon, 1965
 Typhloseiella Muma, 1961

References

Phytoseiidae
Arthropod subfamilies